Seckman High School is a public high school within the Fox C-6 School District, located in Imperial, Missouri. The school was founded in 1997 in order to meet the needs of the growing district. Seckman High School shares a campus with both Seckman Elementary and Seckman Middle School. Seckman is the sister and rival school of Fox High School in nearby Arnold.

References

Public high schools in Missouri
Educational institutions established in 1997
High schools in Jefferson County, Missouri
1997 establishments in Missouri